The Wrestlers is a 1905 oil painting by George Luks held at the Museum of Fine Arts, Boston in Massachusetts, United States. The Wrestlers is Luks' best-known work. The painting depicts two nude men wrestling. He painted it in order to shock members of the Pennsylvania Academy of the Fine Arts whom he called "pink-and-white idiots". The Wrestlers was displayed at the 1908 Ashcan School exhibition. A 1910 article in New York World about the Exhibition of Independent Artists included an image of Luks' The Wrestlers despite the fact that the painting did not appear in that exhibition. In a 1908 diary entry, painter John French Sloan writes that The Wrestlers is among the best paintings he ever encountered. In 1992, art critic Carol Clark identified The Wrestlers as one of Luks' best works, calling it "raw, roughly painted" and reflective of Luks' experiences in New York. In 1996, Allen Guttmann compared Luks' The Wrestlers to Thomas Eakins' Wrestlers and Max Slevogt's Wrestling School, writing that all three paintings depict pairs of nude wrestling men lying on the ground in grappling holds. In the 2009 Dictionary of Modern and Contemporary Art, Ian Chilvers and John Glaves-Smith write that The Wrestlers emulates the "bravura painterly technique of artists such as Manet".

References

Bibliography

1905 paintings
Paintings in the collection of the Museum of Fine Arts, Boston
Nude art
Wrestling in the United States
Paintings of people
Sports paintings
Wrestling culture